Find the Woman is a 1922 American silent mystery film directed by Tom Terriss and starring Alma Rubens. It was produced by Cosmopolitan Productions, owned by William Randolph Hearst, and distributed by Paramount Pictures. The film is based on the 1921 novel of the same name by Arthur Somers Roche.

An incomplete print survives in the Library of Congress.

Plot
As described in a film magazine, Sophie Carey (Rubens), a wealthy lady married to worthless cur Don Carey (Sedley), wrote letters to Judge Walbrough (MacQuarrie) before her marriage. Booking agent Morris Beiner (Donaldson) has obtained these letters and attempts to blackmail the judge. Clancy Deane (Huban), a young woman from the country who has been lured to Broadway by its bright lights, finds lodging in a cheap theatrical boarding house. She meets a man and his wife who direct the aspiring actress to the theatrical agent. At his office, Clancy repulses his advances, and the agent falls and is stunned. Sophie also goes to the agent's office, where he is later found dead and a piece of Sophie's gown is the only clue the police have to the murder. Several other people emerge as possible suspects to the crime, and in the end Sophie's husband is trapped and confesses his guilt.

Cast
Alma Rubens as Sophie Carey
Eileen Huban as Clancy Deane
Harrison Ford as Philip Vandevent
George MacQuarrie as Judge Walbrough
Norman Kerry as Marc Weber
Ethel Duray as Fab Weber
Arthur Donaldson as Morris Beiner
Henry Sedley as Don Carey
Sydney Deane as Sofford
Emily Fitzroy as Mrs. Napoli

References

External links

1922 films
Paramount Pictures films
Films directed by Tom Terriss
1920s mystery drama films
American silent feature films
American black-and-white films
American mystery drama films
1922 drama films
1920s American films
Silent American drama films
Silent mystery drama films
1920s English-language films